Manuel José Soares dos Reis (11 March 1910, Penafiel – 15 April 1990) was a Portuguese footballer who played as a goalkeeper.

References

External links

1910 births
People from Penafiel
1990 deaths
Portuguese footballers
Association football goalkeepers
Primeira Liga players
Leça F.C. players
Boavista F.C. players
FC Porto players
Portugal international footballers
Sportspeople from Porto District